Sydney Russell Carleton (22 February 1904 – 23 October 1973) was a New Zealand rugby union player. A utility back, Carleton represented  at a provincial level, and was a member of the New Zealand national side, the All Blacks, in 1928 and 1929. In his 21 matches for the All Blacks, including six internationals, he scored two tries.

References

1904 births
1973 deaths
Rugby union players from Christchurch
People educated at Christchurch Boys' High School
New Zealand rugby union players
New Zealand international rugby union players
Canterbury rugby union players
Rugby union centres
Rugby union fullbacks